Walterswil may refer to several places in Switzerland:

Walterswil, Solothurn, a municipality in the district of Olten
Walterswil, Berne, a municipality in the district of Trachselwald
Walterswil, Zug (Walterswil-Sihlbrugg), part of Baar, Switzerland